Joyce Cuoco is a former American ballerina. She came to great acclaim at a young age, particularly for her ability to sustain long balances and her multiple pirouettes. Cuoco's early training was with Harriet Hoctor and Boston Ballet founder, E. Virginia Williams. She quickly rose to great popular success as a "baby ballerina". She appeared on The Ed Sullivan Show and The Danny Kaye Show in 1966, and later headlined at Radio City Music Hall. In every appearance she would charm the audience with her smile and her astonishing dancing.

Cuoco later became a soloist with the John Cranko's Stuttgart Ballet and remained in Germany for the remainder of her career. She now works as the assistant to Youri Vámos, acting as the assistant to the choreographer and/or the stage manager for many of his full-length ballet productions. She also works at the Ballet of the Deutsche Oper in Düsseldorf as the director of the ballet school.

References

External links 
 Archive film of Joyce Cuoco and Youri Vamos dancing Spring Waters in 1979 at Jacob's Pillow
 

American ballerinas
Living people
Year of birth missing (living people)
21st-century American women